A distichia is an eyelash that arises from an abnormal part of the eyelid. This abnormality, attributed to a genetic mutation, is known to affect dogs and humans. Distichiae usually exit from the duct of the meibomian gland at the eyelid margin. They are usually multiple, and sometimes more than one arises from a duct. They can affect either the upper or lower eyelid and are usually bilateral. The lower eyelids of dogs usually have no eyelashes.

Distichiae usually cause no symptoms, because the lashes are soft, but they can irritate the eye and cause tearing, squinting, inflammation, corneal ulcers and scarring. Treatment options include manual removal, electrolysis, electrocautery, CO2 laser ablation, cryotherapy, and surgery.

Commonly affected breeds
In veterinary medicine, some canine breeds are affected by distichiasis more frequently than others:
Cocker Spaniel
Dachshund (especially the miniature longhaired Dachshund)
Bulldog
Pekingese
Yorkshire Terrier
Flat-Coated Retriever
Shetland Sheepdog
Boxer
Poodle

Ectopic cilia
An ectopic cilia is a special type of distichia usually found in younger dogs. Commonly affected breeds include Poodles, Golden Retrievers, and Shih Tzus. The eyelash exits through the conjunctiva of the eyelid facing toward the eye, usually at the middle of the upper eyelid. It can cause intense pain and corneal ulcers. Treatment is surgery or cryotherapy.

See also
Trichiasis
Lymphedema distichiasis

References

External links 

Dog diseases
Congenital disorders of eyes